Alright, Still is the debut studio album by English singer Lily Allen, released on 13 July 2006 by Regal Recordings. After being rejected by several record labels, Allen signed to London Records, who eventually lost interest in her, leading her to meet production duo Future Cut and sign to Regal Recordings. Recording for the album began in 2004 with sessions between Allen and Future Cut, and Allen's work garnered publicity on the internet as she posted demos to her MySpace account before they were officially released. Allen later travelled to the United States to work with Greg Kurstin and Mark Ronson, to complete the final half of the album in 2006.

Alright, Still is predominately a pop album, with songs that are heavily influenced by Jamaican ska music, reggae and hip hop. The lyrics are conversational and farcical, discussing past relationships with a dark sense of humour. Due to the instances of strong language in a majority of the songs, the album was released with a Parental Advisory warning, although the song "Friday Night" remains censored on all versions of the album.

Upon release, Alright, Still received acclaim from the British music press, with international critics calling the record and Allen "original". It was commercially successful in the United Kingdom, where it debuted at number two on the UK Albums Chart and was later certified triple platinum. Alright, Still has sold over 2.5 million copies worldwide. The album earned a nomination for Best Alternative Music Album at the 50th Grammy Awards. It was promoted by the release of four singles, including the chart-topper "Smile" and the top-10 single "LDN".

Background
When her family went to Ibiza on holiday, Allen told her mother that she was staying with friends but remained in Sant Antoni de Portmany instead. She earned money by working at a Plastic Fantastic record store and dealing ecstasy. Allen met her first manager, George Lamb, in Ibiza. She was rejected by several labels, which she attributed to her drinking and being the daughter of actor Keith Allen. She eventually used her father's connections to get signed to London Records in 2002. When the executive who had signed her left, the label lost interest and she left without releasing the folk songs that had been written for her, many of which were written by her father. She then studied horticulture to become a florist, but changed her mind and returned to music. Allen began writing songs, while her manager introduced her to production duo Future Cut in 2004. They worked in a small studio in the basement of an office building.

Development
Allen's manager introduced her to production duo Future Cut in 2004. They worked in a small studio in the basement of a Manchester office building. In 2005, Allen was signed to Regal Recordings; the label gave her £25,000 to produce an album, though they were unable to provide much support for it due to their preoccupation with other releases such as Coldplay's X&Y and Gorillaz' Demon Days.

Allen created an account on MySpace and began posting demos in November 2005. The demos attracted thousands of listeners, and 500 limited edition 7" vinyl singles of one of the demos, a song titled "LDN", were rush-released and sold for as much as £40. Allen also produced two mixtapes titled My First Mixtape and My Second Mixtape to promote her work, including tracks by the band Creedence Clearwater Revival and rappers Dizzee Rascal and Ludacris. As she accumulated tens of thousands of MySpace friends, The Observer Music Monthly (OMM), a magazine published in The Observer, took interest. Few people outside of her label's A&R department had heard of Allen, so the label were slow in responding to publications who wanted to report about her.

In March 2006, OMM published an article about Allen's success through MySpace, and she received her first major mainstream coverage appearing in the magazine's cover story two months later. The popularity of her songs convinced her label to allow her more creative control over the album and to use some of the songs that she had written instead of attempting to work with mainstream producers. Allen found herself distracted by the publicity, so to focus on finishing the album, she travelled to the United States to work with producers Greg Kurstin and Mark Ronson. There, she was able to complete the second half of the album in approximately two weeks.

The album's title is used in a line from the second track, "Knock 'Em Out": "You look alright still, yeah what's your name?"

Music and lyrics

In her songs, Allen develops various personas. She stated that she tried to "write about stuff that happens to people from all different backgrounds". The lyrics are conversational, with a dark sense of humour. In many of the songs, one of Allen's personae disparages someone around her. In "Smile", "Not Big", and "Shame for You", she insults an ex-boyfriend. In "Knock 'Em Out", she mocks suitors at a bar, and Lily reprimands her brother Alfie on the song of the same name.

Joe Strummer, a close friend of Allen's father Keith, played mixtapes of Brazilian music and Jamaican reggae and ska when she was young. Allen stated that she had "always been into very black music" such as ska, reggae, and hip hop music. Since she did not know how to rap, she chose to use reggae as a point of reference when making Alright, Still. The album's music blends ska and reggae with pop melodies. Allen's melodies are influenced by the jazz improvisation techniques of American singers Blossom Dearie and Ella Fitzgerald. The album's beats are influenced by various genres such as jazz and grime.

Promotion

In 2007, Allen played the newly launched Park Stage at the Glastonbury Festival, replacing M.I.A. who had cancelled. During the festival she reunited two members of the Specials, an act that guitarist Lynval Golding claimed played a "massive part" in the group's 2009 reunion.

On the day "Smile" was released, Allen appeared on BBC Radio 1's Live Lounge with DJ Jo Whiley, performing an acoustic version of "Smile" and a cover of the Kooks' song "Naïve". At the Secret Garden Party, in September 2006, Allen made a rendition of the song and afterwards stated: "The festival was well good, particularly as Lester, my ex, who I wrote 'Smile' about, and subsequently sold his story to the papers, had a tent called 'the shit tent' positioned directly opposite the main stage. So he and his new girlfriend had no option but to watch me perform to a couple of thousand people singing 'Smile' back to me. Oh, it's the little things eh!" "Smile" was performed live as part of the setlist of Allen's 2007 concert tour. During the 2007 South by Southwest music festival, Allen said, "I'm so sick of this song, but I'll play it for you, Austin" before singing it. On 3 February 2007, the singer was invited as a musical guest on Saturday Night Live, where she performed "Smile" and "LDN".

Critical reception

Alright, Still received generally positive reviews from music critics. At Metacritic, which assigns a normalised rating out of 100 to reviews from mainstream publications, the album received an average score of 79, based on 27 reviews. The Observers Rosie Swash stated that Allen's "uniquely acidic brand of pop" music justified the publicity it generated and that "the icing on the cake is that brutally barbed tongue". Ron Webb wrote for Drowned in Sound that the album "is almost a brilliant record, easily a good one and one that promises to divide opinion like Marmite". In a review for The Guardian, Sophie Heawood stated that "the album is rough round the edges, that amateurism serves to bring the listener in", noting that it gave the album a more personal touch. NMEs Priya Elan remarked that "with a personality this size, this isn't the last time you'll be hearing from [Allen]".

The album generally received positive reviews from international music press. Rob Sheffield wrote for Rolling Stone that Allen's sense of irony was "just more proof that [she's] an original". Heather Phares of AllMusic stated that "enough of Alright, Still works—as pure pop and on the meta level Allen aims for—to make the album a fun, summery fling, and maybe more". Praising Allen for her "genuine personality with wit and attitude to spare", Pitchforks Mark Pytlik remarked that the album "isn't anything else but a fantastic success". In his review for Blender, Jon Dolan complimented Allen's "little-sisterly" personality, describing it as a combination "of panache and self-doubt, courage and chaos".

On the other hand, Stylus Magazine dismissed the album as "nothing more than pop for people who hate pop music" and "phony music for people who can't let go of their inhibitions", while Slant Magazine deemed it "rubbish" and called Allen "sickeningly contemptuous". The mastering of Alright, Still, done by Tim Burrell and Tim Debney, has been criticised. In January 2007, The Guardian ran a piece about loudness wars, the practice of increasing the loudness of tracks which often results in distortion and the loss of dynamic range. It included Alright, Still in a list of CDs in which sound quality was compromised for loudness. Rolling Stone published a similar story in December 2007, and it also identified Alright, Still as an album "so unrelentingly loud that the sound is actually distorted".

Accolades
The Guardian ranked it the seventh best album of the year and commented, "For her lyrical nous and her quick delivery alone, get that toast on." Pitchfork called it "one of 2006's most enduringly rewarding pop albums" and listed it as the 29th best album of 2006.
"Rolling Stone" ranked the album 13th on its list of the best albums of 2007. Uncut called it "a terrific, bolshy, eclectic stew of London street pop", listing Alright, Still at number 38 on its "Definitive Albums of 2006". The Observer ranked the album tenth on its list of the best albums of 2006.
At the 2008 Grammy Awards, the album was nominated for Best Alternative Music Album but lost to the White Stripes' Icky Thump. Ronson's production on "Littlest Things" helped him win a Grammy Award for Producer of the Year, Non-Classical.

Commercial performance
Alright, Still debuted at number two on the UK Albums Chart, selling 62,701 copies in its first week. During the week ending 3 February 2007, all top 10 places on the UK Albums Chart were occupied by British artists for the first time since the chart was established in 1956; Alright, Still was number nine that week. The British Phonographic Industry (BPI) certified it triple platinum on 14 March 2008. As of June 2018, the album had sold 1,142,062 copies in the United Kingdom.

In Ireland, the album debuted at number six on the Irish Albums Chart and was certified platinum by the Irish Recorded Music Association (IRMA). The album was less successful in continental Europe; it charted inside the top 20 in Norway, the top 30 in Belgium and the Netherlands, and the top 50 in France and Sweden. In April 2007, Alright, Still received a Platinum Europe Award by the International Federation of the Phonographic Industry (IFPI), denoting sales in excess of one million copies across Europe.

Alright, Still debuted at number 20 on the Billboard 200 in the United States, with first-week sales of 34,000 copies. The Recording Industry Association of America (RIAA) awarded the album a gold certification on 6 December 2007, and by November 2013, it had sold 627,000 copies in the US. Alright, Still peaked at number seven on the Australian ARIA Albums Chart, and in 2009, it received a platinum accreditation by the Australian Recording Industry Association (ARIA), shipping over 70,000 copies. In New Zealand, the album reached number 26 and was certified gold by the Recording Industry Association of New Zealand (RIANZ) for shipments in excess of 7,500 copies. As of February 2009, the album had sold more than 2.5 million copies worldwide.

Track listing

Notes
  signifies a remixer

Sample credits
 "Smile" contains replayed elements of "Free Soul" by Jackie Mittoo and Clement Dodd.
 "Knock 'Em Out" contains replayed elements of the work "Big Chief" by Earl King.
 "LDN" contains replayed elements of "Reggae Merengue".
 "Littlest Things" contains elements from "Theme from Emmanuelle (Instrumental)" and "Emmanuelle in the Mirror" written by Pierre Bachelet and Hervé Roy.
 "Friend of Mine" contains elements from "For the Love of You" written and composed by O'Kelly Isley, Jr., Ernest Isley, Rudolph Isley, Ronald Isley, Marvin Isley and Chris Jasper.

Personnel
Credits adapted from the liner notes of Alright, Still.

Musicians

 Lily Allen – vocals
 Mark Ronson – beats, harp, synth strings, percussion 
 Michael Rose – saxophone 
 Paul Powell – drums 
 Jonny Wimbolt-Lewis – drums 
 Eddie Thornton – trumpet 
 Trevor Edwards – trombone 
 Clive Hunte – bass 
 John Waddington – bass 
 Paul Farr – guitar 
 Mark Nicholls – guitar 
 John Ellis – keyboards 
 Oliver Bayston – keyboards 
 Darren Lewis – keyboards ; percussion 
 Iyiola Babalola – keyboards ; percussion

Technical

 Future Cut – production ; mixing 
 Mike Pelanconi – mixing ; engineering 
 Dan Porter – mixing assistance 
 Greg Kurstin – production, recording, mixing 
 Pablo Cook – production 
 Blair MacKichan – production 
 Mark Ronson – production, recording 
 Vaughan Merrick – mixing 
 Rob Smith – recording 
 Kieran Panesar – recording assistance 
 Tim Burrell – mastering
 Tim Debney – mastering
 George Atkins – engineering 
 Darren Lewis – engineering, production 
 Iyiola Babalola – engineering, production

Artwork
 Check Morris – artwork

Charts

Weekly charts

Year-end charts

Certifications

Release history

Notes

References

2006 debut albums
Albums produced by Greg Kurstin
Albums produced by Mark Ronson
Capitol Records albums
Contemporary R&B albums by English artists
Lily Allen albums
Reggae albums by English artists